Təzəkənd or Taza-Kend (Azerbaijani for "new village") may refer to:
Təzəkənd, Agdam, Azerbaijan
Təzəkənd, Aghjabadi, Azerbaijan
Təzəkənd, Beylagan, Azerbaijan
Təzəkənd, Bilasuvar (disambiguation)
 Təzəkənd (39° 21' N 48° 35' E), Bilasuvar, Azerbaijan
 Təzəkənd (39° 32' N 48° 24' E), Bilasuvar, Azerbaijan
Təzəkənd, Dashkasan, Azerbaijan
Təzəkənd, Davachi, Azerbaijan
Təzəkənd (near Surra), Davachi, Azerbaijan
Təzəkənd, Ismailli, Azerbaijan
Təzəkənd, Jalilabad, Azerbaijan
Təzəkənd, Kalbajar, Azerbaijan
Təzəkənd, Khizi, Azerbaijan
Təzəkənd, Lachin, Azerbaijan
Təzəkənd, Lankaran, Azerbaijan
Təzəkənd, Masally, Azerbaijan
Təzəkənd, Nakhchivan (disambiguation)
Təzəkənd, Kangarli, Azerbaijan
Təzəkənd, Maxta, Azerbaijan
Təzəkənd, Sharur, Azerbaijan
Təzəkənd, Salyan, Azerbaijan
Təzəkənd, Shamkir, Azerbaijan
Təzəkənd, Tartar, Azerbaijan
Təzəkənd, Yardymli, Azerbaijan
Təzəkənd, Zardab, Azerbaijan
Taza-Kend, Iran, a village in Ardabil Province, Iran
Tazakand, Iran, a village in Razavi Khorasan Province, Iran

See also
Tazakend (disambiguation)
Tazeh Kand (disambiguation)